is a private university in Sakai, Osaka, Japan. The predecessor of the school was founded in 1916, and it was chartered as a junior college in 1987. The school became a four-year college in 1998 and adopted the present name in 2003.

External links
 Official website 

Educational institutions established in 1916
Private universities and colleges in Japan
Universities and colleges in Osaka Prefecture
1916 establishments in Japan
Sakai, Osaka